José Bartolomeu Barrocal Rita dos Mártires  (2 April 1932 – deceased), commonly known as Zé Rita, was a Portuguese footballer who played as a goalkeeper.

Honours
Benfica
 Intercontinental Cup runner-up: 1962

External links
 

1932 births
Year of death missing
Place of death missing
People from Vila Real de Santo António
Portuguese footballers
Association football goalkeepers
Segunda Divisão players
Primeira Liga players
S.C. Olhanense players
Sporting CP footballers
S.C. Covilhã players
S.L. Benfica footballers
Casa Pia A.C. players
Sportspeople from Faro District